Democratic Alliance may refer to:

Current political parties
Democratic Alliance (South Africa)
DEMOS (Montenegro)
Democratic Alliance (Hong Kong)
Democratic Alliance (Ukraine)
Democratic Alliance List
Democratic Alliance Party (Haiti)
Singapore Democratic Alliance

Defunct political parties or coalitions
British Columbia Democratic Alliance
Democratic Alliance (Bulgaria)
Democratic Alliance of Chile
Democratic Alliance (Chile, 1983)
Democratic Alliance for Egypt
Democratic Alliance (Greece)
Democratic Alliance (Guinea-Bissau)
Democratic Alliance (Italy)
Democratic Alliance (Palestine)
Democratic Alliance (Philippines)
Democratic Alliance (Portugal)
Democratic Alliance (Quebec)
Democratic Alliance (Sweden)
Democratic Republican Alliance, France

See also
Alliance for Democracy (disambiguation)
Democratic Alliance Party (disambiguation)
Democratic Coalition (disambiguation)
Democratic Movement (disambiguation)
Democratic Party (disambiguation)
Democratic Union (disambiguation)